Stadionul Clinceni is a multi-purpose stadium in Clinceni, Romania. It is currently used mostly for football matches and is the home ground of LPS HD Clinceni and Unirea Constanța. The stadium has a capacity of 4,500 seats.

References

Football venues in Romania
Buildings and structures in Ilfov County
Multi-purpose stadiums in Romania